Ambalantota is a coastal town in southern Sri Lanka.  It is located in Southern Province in Hambantota District between Matara and Hambantota.

The Valave River meets the sea near Ambalantota.

The Ambalantota is famous for its ancient ruins of the Kingdom of Ruhuna. After his many conquests abroad King Gajaba returned to the country from the port of Godavaya that is within sight of Ambalantota.

History
Ambalantota played an important role in past Sri Lanka as the major city of the Kingdom of Ruhuna. It was called 'Manaulu Pura'. The great king Vijayaba, the great warrior Therapuththabhaya, Divisional king Mahanagha made Ambalantota flourish and Ridiyagama was the commercial hub in those days.

Attractions
There are many remarkable places in Ambalantota.
 Ussangoda Beach - Nonagama
 Ochchama Beach - Nonagama
 Godawaya Beach - Godawaya (Dehigahalanda, Ambalantota)
 Godawaya ancient port - (Dehigahalanda, Ambalantota)
 Ridiyagama Lake
 Safari park - Ridiyagama
 Kalamatiya Bird Century - Hungama
 Madunagala Temple - Koggalla
 Walawe River Mouth - Ambalantota
 Mangrove forest - Ambalantota
 Karadhulena Temple - Koggalla
 Liyangastota Amuna - Barawakubuka
 Lunama kalapuwa-lunama
 Ussangoda National Park-Lunama, Nonagama
 Nonagama water park - Nonagama
 Kirala Kele Forest - Malpeththawa

Valuable ancient temples
 Ramba Raja Maha Vihara
 Madhunagala Raja Maha Vihara
 Karadhulena Raja Maha Vihara
 Girihandu Raja Maha Vihara
 Wilgamvehera Raja Maha vihara
 Galvila Raja Maha vihara
 Uswella Raja Maha Vihara
 Godavaya Raja Maha vihara
 Therapuththabhaya Raja Maha viharaya
 Rangiri Raja Maha viharaya

Transport
The town is served by public and private buses. The Mattala Rajapaksa International Airport (MRIA) (also known as the Hambantota International Airport) (IATA: HRI, ICAO: VCRI) is the closest international airport serving the town from nearby Hambantota.

Education
Theraputtha National School is the leading and popular mixed school in Ambalantota. The other leading schools are Vijayaba Central College (mixed) - Hungama and Ambalantota Maha Vidyalaya (mixed) - Malpeththawa.

Surrounding Ambalantota, the other leading schools are Bolana Maha Vidyalaya (mixed) – Bolana and St Mary's Central College, Hambantota (mixed).
The Open University of Sri Lanka has opened a Study Centre for Ambalantota in Rajasaranagama Road, Lunama South, Ambalantota which will play an important role in improving the knowledge for Hambantota students. They offer a wide variety of Higher Education programmes in Management, Language, Education, Engineering, Information Technology, Human Resource Management, etc.

Development
The area is part of the southeastern region of Sri Lanka experiencing extensive investment in new infrastructure and services. The new Hambantota Port (Magampura Mahinda Rajapaksa Port) is situated near Ambalantota.  A new botanical garden is also proposed for Ambalantota.

A  Safari Park is being constructed in Ridiyagama, Ambalantota. The Safari Park is scheduled to open in April 2014

References

External links
 HambantotaZone- Hambantota District Travel information
 Ambalantota Travel Guides and Place to Visit, News, Photos
 Ambalantota Divisional Secretariat
 Discover Sri Lanka - More information & images about Ambalantota
 

Populated places in Southern Province, Sri Lanka